Bosor was an ancient Biblical Levitical city and one of the three Trans-Jordanian Cities of Refuge named in the Mosaic Law. It was located in Gilead, and was conquered by Judas Maccabeus.  It is sometimes identified with modern-day Busra al-Harir.

Josephus commented on its conquest.

References

External links
Jewish Encyclopedia article

Levitical cities
Gilead